The Skif Skif-A is a Ukrainian single-place paraglider that was designed by Sergei Rozhko and produced by Skif Paragliding of Feodosia. It is now out of production.

Design and development
The aircraft was designed as a beginner and intermediate glider. The models are each named for their approximate wing area in square metres.

Variants
Skif-A 27
Small-sized model for lighter pilots.
Skif-A 28
Mid-sized model for medium-weight pilots.
Skif-A 30
Large-sized model for heavier pilots.

Specifications (Skif-A 28)

References

Skif-A
Paragliders